A flavor of the k·p perturbation theory used for calculating the structure of multiple, degenerate electronic bands in bulk and quantum well semiconductors. The method is a generalization of the single band k·p theory.

In this model the influence of all other bands is taken into account by using Löwdin's perturbation method.

Background 

All bands can be subdivided into two classes:

 Class A: six valence bands (heavy hole, light hole, split off band and their spin counterparts) and two conduction bands.
 Class B: all other bands.

The method concentrates on the bands in Class A, and takes into account Class B bands perturbatively.

We can write the perturbed solution  as a linear combination of the unperturbed eigenstates :

Assuming the unperturbed eigenstates are orthonormalized, the eigenequation are:

,

where

.

From this expression we can write:

,

where the first sum on the right-hand side is over the states in class A only, while the second sum is over the states on class B. Since we are interested in the coefficients  for m in class A, we may eliminate those in class B by an iteration procedure to obtain:

,

Equivalently, for :

and

.

Schrödinger equation and basis functions 

The Hamiltonian including the spin-orbit interaction can be written as:

,

where  is the Pauli spin matrix vector. Substituting into the Schrödinger equation we obtain

,

where

and the perturbation Hamiltonian can be defined as

The unperturbed Hamiltonian refers to the band-edge spin-orbit system (for k=0). At the band edge, conduction band Bloch waves exhibit s-like symmetry, while valence band states are p-like (3-fold degenerate without spin). These Bloch functions can be pictured as periodic repetition of atomic orbitals, repeated at intervals corresponding to the lattice spacing. The Bloch function can be expanded in the following manner:

,

.

Using Löwdin's method, only the following eigenvalue problem needs to be solved

where

,

The second term of  can be neglected compared to the similar term with p instead of k. Similarly to the single band case, we can write for 

We now define the following parameters

and the band structure parameters (or the Luttinger parameters) can be defined to be

The third parameter  relates to the anisotropy of the energy band structure around the  point when .

Explicit Hamiltonian matrix 

The Luttinger-Kohn Hamiltonian  can be written explicitly as a 8X8 matrix (taking into account 8 bands - 2 conduction, 2 heavy-holes, 2 light-holes and 2 split-off)

Summary

References 
  2. Luttinger, J. M. Kohn, W., "Motion of Electrons and Holes in Perturbed Periodic Fields", Phys. Rev. 97,4. pp. 869-883, (1955). https://journals.aps.org/pr/abstract/10.1103/PhysRev.97.869

Condensed matter physics